Weberocereus imitans, commonly known as fishbone cactus or zig-zag cactus, is an epiphytic cactus native to Costa Rica. Its flower is small compared with the other two "fishbone cacti", Selenicereus anthonyanus and Disocactus anguliger.

References 

imitans